Viscous remanent magnetization (abbreviated VRM), also known as viscous magnetization, is remanence that is acquired by ferromagnetic materials by sitting in a magnetic field for some time. The natural remanent magnetization of an igneous rock can be altered by this process. This is generally an unwanted component and some form of stepwise demagnetization must be used to remove it.

Origin 

Viscous remanent magnetization is the result of jumps between magnetic states driven by thermal fluctuations. In the simplest case, there is a single characteristic time  called the thermal relaxation time.

The above equation is applicable to the simplest single domain magnets, those described by the Stoner–Wohlfarth model. The relaxation time  depends on factors such as the size of the magnet and its magnetic anisotropy. Rocks have collections of magnetic minerals with varying size and anisotropy, and therefore a broad spectrum of relaxation times. The magnetization tends to have a logarithmic dependence on time, so the rate of change is often represented by a viscosity coefficient

Significance for paleomagnetism 

Paleomagnetists are interested in the primary natural remanent magnetization (NRM) in a rock, acquired when the rock was originally formed. Viscous remanent magnetization is regarded as noise. Any component of the NRM that is in the direction of the present Earth's field is suspect because it may have been acquired since the last geomagnetic reversal. VRM is often removed by the first steps in a stepwise thermal demagnetization of the NRM. 

VRM may also be acquired in the laboratory while measuring the NRM. To avoid this, paleomagnetists make their measurements in a magnetically shielded environment. Often the magnetometer is housed in a room with walls made of mu-metal.

See also 
Rock magnetism

Notes

References

Rock magnetism
Ferromagnetism